Seventh Avenue is a six-part American television miniseries broadcast in 1977. It is based on the 1967 Norman Bogner novel of the same name. The miniseries was directed by Richard Irving and Russ Marberry, and produced by Franklin Barton and Richard Irving. The music is by Nelson Riddle.

Seventh Avenue was broadcast on NBC from February 10 to February 24, 1977 as six episodes in three two-hour blocks. It stars Steven Keats, Dori Brenner, Anne Archer and Jane Seymour.

The storyline deals with a poor young man (Keats) from Manhattan's Lower East Side who is determined to rise to the top of the garment industry on Seventh Avenue.

Cast
 Steven Keats - Jay Blackman
 Dori Brenner - Rhoda Gold Blackman
 Jane Seymour - Eva Myers
 Anne Archer - Myrna Gold
 Kristoffer Tabori - Al Blackman
 Herschel Bernardi - Joe Vitelli
 Richard Dimitri - Frank Topo
 Jack Gilford - Finklestein
 Mike Kellin - Morris Blackman
 Alan King - Harry Lee
 Ray Milland - Douglas Fredericks
 Paul Sorvino - Dave Shaw
 Eli Wallach - Gus Farber
 William Windom - John Myers
 John Pleshette - Marty Cass
 Robert Symonds - Edward Gold
 Anne Berger - Celia Blackman
 Joshua Freund - Neal Blackman
 Gloria Grahame - Moll
 Brock Peters - Sgt. Rollins
 Ellen Greene - Paula Cass
 Lou Cristolo - Creeden
 Ron Max - Ray Boone
 Graham Beckel - Det. Clever

External links
 

1977 American television series debuts
1977 American television series endings
1970s American television miniseries
English-language television shows
Television shows based on American novels
Television series set in the 1930s
Television shows set in New York City
NBC original programming